Li-Young Lee (李立揚, pinyin: Lǐ Lìyáng) (born August 19, 1957) is an American poet. He was born in Jakarta, Indonesia, to Chinese parents. His maternal great-grandfather was Yuan Shikai, China's first Republican President, who attempted to make himself emperor. Lee's father, who was a personal physician to Mao Zedong while in China, relocated his family to Indonesia, where he helped found Gamaliel University. In 1959 the Lee family fled Indonesia to escape widespread anti-Chinese sentiment and after a five-year trek through Hong Kong and Japan, they settled in the United States in 1964. Li-Young Lee attended the University of Pittsburgh, the University of Arizona, and the State University of New York at Brockport.

Development as a poet
Lee attended the University of Pittsburgh, where he began to develop his love for writing. He had seen his father find his passion for ministry and as a result of his father reading to him and encouraging Lee to find his passion, Lee began to dive into the art of language. Lee's writing has also been influenced by classic Chinese poets, such as Li Bai and Du Fu. Many of Lee's poems are filled with themes of simplicity, strength, and silence. All are strongly influenced by his family history, childhood, and individuality. He writes with simplicity and passion which creates images that take the reader deeper and also requires his audience to fill in the gaps with their own imagination. These feelings of exile and boldness to rebel take shape as they provide common themes for poems.

Lee's influence on Asian American poetry

Li-Young Lee has been an established Asian American poet who has been doing interviews for the past twenty years. Breaking the Alabaster Jar: Conversations with Li-Young Lee (BOA Editions, 2006, ed. Earl G. Ingersoll), is the first edited and published collection of interviews with an Asian American poet. In this book, Earl G. Ingersoll has collected interviews with the poet consisting of "conversational" questions meant to bring out Lee's  views on Asian American poetry, writing, and identity.

Awards and honors
Lee has won numerous poetry awards:
 1986: Delmore Schwartz Memorial Award, from New York University, for Rose
 1988: Whiting Award
 1990: Lamont Poetry Selection for The City in Which I Love You
 1995: Lannan Literary Award
 1995: American Book Award, from the Before Columbus Foundation, for The Wingéd Seed: A Remembrance
 2002: William Carlos Williams Award for Book of My Nights (American Poets Continuum) Judge: Carolyn Kizer
 2003: Fellowship of the Academy of American Poets, which does not accept applications and which includes a $25,000 stipend
 Fellowship, National Endowment for the Arts
 Fellowship, John Simon Guggenheim Memorial Foundation
 Grant, Illinois Arts Council
 Grant, Commonwealth of Pennsylvania
 Grant, Pennsylvania Council on the Arts

Other recognition
 2011: Lee's poem ″A Story″ was featured in the AP English Literature and Composition 2011 Free-Response Questions.

Selected bibliography

Poetry
 1986: Rose. Rochester: BOA Editions Limited, 
 1990: The City In Which I Love You. Rochester: BOA Editions Limited, 
 2001: Book of My Nights. Rochester: BOA Editions Limited, 
 2008: Behind My Eyes. New York: W.W. Norton & Co., 
 2018: The Undressing. New York: W.W. Norton & Co.,

Memoir
The Wingéd Seed: A Remembrance. (hardcover) New York: Simon & Schuster, 1995. ASIN: B000NGRB2G (paperback) St. Paul: Ruminator, 1999.

See also

List of Asian American writers

Critical studies 
as of March 2008:

Meaning Maker By: Butts, Lisa; Publishers Weekly, 2007 Nov 19; 254 (56): 38.
Li-Young Lee no hyoka o tooshite By: Kajiwara, Teruko; Eigo Seinen/Rising Generation, 2006 July; 152 (4): 212-13.
Transcendentalism, Ethnicity, and Food in the Work of Li-Young Lee By: Xu, Wenying; Boundary 2: An International Journal of Literature and Culture, 2006 Summer; 33 (2): 129-57.
An Exile's Will to Canon and Its Tension with Ethnicity: Li-Young Lee By: Xu, Wenying. IN: Bona and Maini, Multiethnic Literature and Canon Debates. Albany, NY: State U of New York P; 2006. pp. 145–64
Li-Young Lee By: Davis, Rocío G.. IN: Madsen, Asian American Writers. Detroit, MI: Gale; 2005. pp. 202–06
'Let the Word Speak through: Jordan C. Wise in Conversation with Li-Young Lee', New Walk, Autumn/Winter 2013; 7: 20-23. 
'Your Otherness Is Perfect as My Death': The Ethics and Aesthetics of Li-Young Lee's Poetry By: Zhou, Xiaojing. IN: Fahraeus and Jonsson, Textual Ethos Studies or Locating Ethics. New York, NY: Rodopi; 2005. pp. 297–314
Sexual Desire and Cultural Memory in Three Ethnic Poets By: Basford, Douglas; MELUS: The Journal of the Society for the Study of the Multi-Ethnic Literature of the United States, 2004 Fall-Winter; 29 (3-4): 243-56.
The Politics of Ethnic Authorship: Li-Young Lee, Emerson, and Whitman at the Banquet Table By: Partridge, Jeffrey F. L.; Studies in the Literary Imagination, 2004 Spring; 37 (1): 101-26.
Interview with Li-Young Lee By: Bilyak, Dianne; Massachusetts Review: A Quarterly of Literature, the Arts and Public Affairs, 2003-2004 Winter; 44 (4): 600-12.
Poetries of Transformation: Joy Harjo and Li-Young Lee By: Kolosov, Jacqueline; Studies in American Indian Literatures 2003 Summer; 15 (2): 39-57.
"Father-Stem and Mother-Root": Genealogy, Memory, and the Poetics of Origins in Theodore Roethke, Elizabeth Bishop, and Li-Young Lee By: Malandra, Marc Joseph; Dissertation, Cornell U, 2002.
Forming Personal and Cultural Identities in the Face of Exodus: A Discussion of Li-Young Lee's Poetry By: Jenkins, Tricia; South Asian Review, 2003; 24 (2): 199-210.
Lee's 'Eating Alone' By: Moeser, Daniel; Explicator, 2002 Winter; 60 (2): 117-19.
The Way a Calendar Dissolves: A Refugee's Sense of Time in the Work of Li-Young Lee By: Lorenz, Johnny. IN: Davis and Ludwig, Asian American Literature in the International Context: Readings on Fiction, Poetry, and Performance. Hamburg, Germany: Lit; 2002. pp. 157–69
Night of No Exile By: Jones, Marie C.; Dissertation, U of North Texas, 1999.
Art, Spirituality, and the Ethic of Care: Alternative Masculinities in Chinese American Literature By: Cheung, King-Kok. IN: Gardiner, Masculinity Studies and Feminist Theory: New Directions. New York, NY: Columbia UP; 2002. pp. 261–89
The Precision of Persimmons: Hybridity, Grafting and the Case of Li-Young Lee By: Yao, Steven G.; Lit: Literature Interpretation Theory, 2001 Apr; 12 (1): 1-23.
To Witness the Invisible: A Talk with Li-Young Lee By: Marshall, Tod; Kenyon Review, 2000 Winter; 22 (1): 129-47.
Beyond Lot's Wife: The Immigration Poems of Marilyn Chin, Garrett Hongo, Li-Young Lee, and David Mura By: Slowik, Mary; MELUS, 2000 Fall-Winter; 25 (3-4): 221-42.
Form and Identity in Language Poetry and Asian American Poetry By: Yu, Timothy; Contemporary Literature, 2000 Spring; 41 (3): 422-61.
An Interview with Li-Young Lee By: Fluharty, Matthew; Missouri Review, 2000; 23 (1): 81-99.
Li-Young Lee By: Lee, James Kyung-Jin. IN: Cheung, Words Matter: Conversations with Asian American Writers. Honolulu: U of Hawaii P, with UCLA Asian American Studies Center; 2000. pp. 270–80
Necessary Figures: Metaphor, Irony and Parody in the Poetry of Li-Young Lee, Marilyn Chin, and John Yau By: Wang, Dorothy Joan; Dissertation,U of California, Berkeley, 1998.
A Conversation with Li-Young Lee ; Indiana Review, 1999 Fall-Winter; 21 (2): 101-08.
The Cultural Predicaments of Ethnic Writers: Three Chicago Poets By: Bresnahan, Roger J. Jiang; Midwestern Miscellany, 1999 Fall; 27: 36-46.
The City in Which I Love You: Li-Young Lee's Excellent Song By: Hesford, Walter A.; Christianity and Literature, 1996 Autumn; 46 (1): 37-60.
Lee's 'Persimmons' By: Engles, Tim; Explicator, 1996 Spring; 54 (3): 191-92.
Inheritance and Invention in Li-Young Lee's Poetry By: Zhou, Xiaojing; MELUS, 1996 Spring; 21 (1): 113-32.
Li-Young Lee By: Hsu, Ruth Y. IN: Conte, American Poets since World War II: Fourth Series. Detroit: Thomson Gale; 1996. pp. 139–46
Li-Young Lee By: Lee, James; BOMB, 1995 Spring; 51: 10-13.

External links
 Poems by Li-Young Lee and biography at PoetryFoundation.org
Profile at The Whiting Foundation
 Scene Missing Magazine Interviews Li-Young Lee
 Audio of Lannan Foundation Reading with Li-Young Lee and conversation between Li-Young Lee and Michael Silverblatt
 State of Illinois Site featuring Li-Young Lee
 Li-Young Lee's Reading at BYU entitled "Infinite Inwardness"
 Three Poems by Li-Young Lee
 NewsHour with Jim Lehrer: Li-Young Lee Feature
 Audio: Li-Young Lee reads "To Hold" from the book Behind My Eyes (via poemsoutloud.net)
 Audio: "Immigrant Blues" from Behind My Eyes, read by Li-Young Lee

References

1957 births
Living people
People from Jakarta
Indonesian emigrants to the United States
Indonesian people of Chinese descent
University of Pittsburgh alumni
University of Arizona alumni
State University of New York at Brockport alumni
American male poets
American poets
American writers of Chinese descent
PEN Oakland/Josephine Miles Literary Award winners
American Book Award winners